FOTW may refer to:

Arts and media 
 Fall of the West Records
 Fate of the World, a video game
 Flags of the World (website), an Internet-based vexillological resource
 Frost Over the World, an Al Jazeera programme 
 Fly on the Wall, style of documentary filming

Other uses 
 Fall of the Wall, the end of the Berlin Wall
 Woodlands Church (formerly Fellowship of the Woodlands)